Scarsdale is a town and village in Westchester County, New York, United States. The Town of Scarsdale is coextensive with the Village of Scarsdale, but the community has opted to operate solely with a village government, one of several villages in the state that have a similar governmental situation. As of the 2020 census, Scarsdale's population was 18,253.

History

Colonial era
Caleb Heathcote purchased land that would become Scarsdale at the end of the 17th century and, on March 21, 1701, had it elevated to a royal manor. He named the lands after his ancestral home in Derbyshire, England. The first local census of 1712 counted twelve inhabitants, including seven African slaves. When Caleb died in 1721, his daughters inherited the property. The estate was broken up in 1774, and the town was officially founded on March 7, 1788.

The town saw fighting during the American Revolution when the Continental and British armies clashed briefly at what is now the junction of Garden Road and Mamaroneck Road. The British commander, Sir William Howe, lodged at a farmhouse on Garden Road that remains standing. Scarsdale's wartime history formed the basis for James Fenimore Cooper's 1821 novel, The Spy: A Tale of the Neutral Ground, written while the author lived at the Angevine Farm in the present-day Heathcote section of town.

1790–1945
According to the first federal census in 1790, the town's population was 281. By 1840, that number had declined to 255—the vast majority farmers and farm workers. In 1846, the New York and Harlem Railroad connected Scarsdale to New York City, leading to an influx of commuters.

The Arthur Suburban Home Company purchased a  farm in 1891 and converted it into a subdevelopment of one-family dwellings, starting a transformation of the community from rural to suburban. Civil institutions soon appeared: the Heathcote Association (1904), the Town Club (1904), the Scarsdale Woman's Club (1918) and the Scarsdale League of Women Voters (1921). Scarsdale High School and Greenacres Elementary School were built in 1912, and the Edgewood Elementary School opened in 1918. The first store in Scarsdale opened on the corner of Popham Road and Garth Road in 1912. By 1915, the population approached 3000. By 1930, that number approached 10,000.

In 1940, Nazi agent Gerhardt Alois Westrick secretly met with American business leaders at his Scarsdale home until public pressure—a reaction to articles in the New York Herald Tribune produced by British Security Coordination in New York—drove his family from the community. He was subsequently deported for pursuing activities unfriendly to the United States.

1945–present

Scarsdale became the subject of national controversy in the 1950s when a "Committee of Ten" led by Otto Dohrenwend alleged "Communist infiltration" in the public schools. A thorough investigation by the town rejected these claims. This same group, known as the Scarsdale Citizens Committee, sued to prevent a benefit for the Freedom Riders from taking place at the public high school in 1963 because some of the performers (Ossie Davis, Ruby Dee, Pete Seeger) were allegedly "communist sympathizers and subversives."

Another controversy enveloped the town in 1961, when the Scarsdale Golf Club, headed by Charles S. McCallister, refused to allow a young man who had converted from Judaism into the Episcopal Church, Michael Cunningham Hernstadt, to escort a young woman, Pamela Nottage, to her debut at the club. At the time, it was the club's policy to prohibit Jews from the premises. In response, the Rev. George French Kempsell of the Church of Saint James the Less announced that he would ban any supporters of the club's decision from receiving Holy Communion. The event marked a turning point toward the decline of anti-Semitism in the town.

Scarsdale's public library, which had been housed in historic Wayside Cottage since 1928, moved to its present structure on the White Plains Post Road in 1951. The driving force behind the library was New York City publisher S. Spencer Scott, who raised $100,000 for the project after the village rejected a bond issue to fund the building in 1938. The new library opened with 27,000 books and Sylvia C. Hilton serving as the first librarian.

The last of the town's five elementary schools, Heathcote School, opened in September 1953. The $1,000,000 architectural landmark was designed by Perkins & Will of Chicago. Walter B. Cocking, the president of the New York State Committee for the Public Schools, delivered the dedication address.

In 1967, U.S. Secretary of State and former longtime resident Dean Rusk returned to Scarsdale at the height of the Vietnam War to receive the town's Man of the Year Award and was greeted with a silent protest.

Scarsdale was the subject of a landmark United States Supreme Court decision, ACLU v. Scarsdale (1985), that established the so-called "reindeer rule" regarding public nativity scenes and upheld the right of local religious groups to place crèches on public property.

Scarsdale was involved in another United States Supreme Court case in 1985, Board of Trustees of Scarsdale v. McCreary, concerning the display of privately sponsored nativity scenes on public property.

On January 1, 2022, the village of Scarsdale banned the sale of all tobacco and cannabis products and the smoking on public property for people of all ages. After the 60 day grace period, a 100 dollar fine will be imposed by police officers on violators.

Geography
It is located approximately 7 miles to the border of New York City (in The Bronx), 11 miles from the northern tip of Manhattan, and 20 miles from Midtown Manhattan, which may be reached by Metro-North Railroad express train in approximately 30 minutes.

Climate
The town is in a humid continental climate zone (Köppen climate classification: Dfa), with cold, snowy winters and hot, humid summers and four distinct seasons. Scarsdale is just within the hardiness zone 7a, along with New York City and Long Island in New York state, with temperatures below 0 being rare.

Neighborhoods
Scarsdale is divided into five neighborhoods, which correspond to the public elementary schools: Greenacres, Fox Meadow, Heathcote, Quaker Ridge, and Edgewood.

Demographics

As of the 2000 census, there were 17,823 people, 5,662 households, and 4,993 families residing in the village. The population density was 2,685.7 people per square mile (1,036.4/km2). There were 5,795 housing units at an average density of 873.2 per square mile (337.0/km).2

According to the 2000 Census, the race distribution of Scarsdale was: White (non-Hispanic) 84.1%, Hispanic or Latino 2.6%, Asian 12.6%, African-American 1.5%.

There were 5,662 households, out of which 51.0% had children under the age of 18 living with them, 81.8% were married couples living together, 5.0% had a female householder with no husband present, and 11.8% were non-families. 10.6% of all households were made up of individuals, and 6.3% had someone living alone who was 65 years of age or older. The average household size was 3.14 and the average family size was 3.35.

In the village, the age distribution of the population shows 32.8% under the age of 18, 4.0% from 18 to 24, 22.8% from 25 to 44, 28.7% from 45 to 64, and 11.6% who were 65 years of age or older. The median age was 40 years. For every 100 females, there were 94.4 males. For every 100 females age 18 and over, there were 89.2 males.

The median income for a household in the village was $182,792, and the median income for a family was $291,542. Males had a median income of $100,000+ versus $62,319 for females. The per capita income for the village was $89,907. That ranks as the 59th highest income in the country and second most for towns with a population of over 10,000. About 1.7% of families and 2.8% of the population were below the poverty line, including 3.2% of those under age 18 and 2.3% of those age 65 or over.

Ethnic groups

As of 2000 Scarsdale was a favorite location for Japanese expatriates working in the US. According to Lisa W. Foderaro of The New York Times it was well known in Japan as a place with good housing stock and schools. By 1991, many Japanese businesspeople with work assignments in New York City chose to move en masse to Scarsdale. The large settlement of Japanese caused friction among the American population, particularly students at Scarsdale High School. The Japanese residents were unable to take part in much of the town political sphere partly because they were not citizens and partly due to lack of familiarity with American politics. Many Japanese businesses appeared to cater to the community.

Scarsdale has a large and active Jewish population, and there also are burgeoning communities of Indians, Chinese and others.

Arts and culture

Library
The library is one of 38 public libraries in the Westchester Library System. The 25,000 square foot library building houses a collection of over 147,000 books and audiovisual materials. The library was renovated extensively, and after operating at a temporary location for several years, re-opened in 2021. Approximately 397,084 items are checked out of the library each year.

Historic sites
The Caleb Hyatt House, Scarsdale Railroad Station, Scarsdale Woman's Club, United States Post Office, and Wayside Cottage are listed on the National Register of Historic Places.

Events
The Scarsdale Town Pool was the swimming venue for the 2007 Empire State Games. Scarsdale is home to the Scarsdale Concours d'Elegance, an annual auto show for charity, as well as the Southern Westchester Food and Wine Festival.

Government
Scarsdale selects its Board of Trustees using a nonpartisan system that dates back to 1911. Candidates for office are privately interviewed by a diversely composed committee and then nominated for office. New York State law mandates that these nominees must be democratically elected, however, nominated candidates are rarely contested in the general election. The coordinating Scarsdale Citizens' Non-Partisan Party states "The Scarsdale Citizens' Non-Partisan Party promotes the election of non-partisan candidates for village mayor, village trustees and village justice. Our local non-partisan system encourages cooperative, deliberative and open civic government to attract highly qualified individuals to public service.".

Education

The Scarsdale Union Free School District operates five elementary schools serving families from different areas of the town: Edgewood, Fox Meadow, Greenacres, Heathcote and Quaker Ridge. It also operates Scarsdale Middle School and Scarsdale High School. Heathcote Elementary School received the National Blue Ribbon Award in 2020  and Scarsdale High School received it in 1983.

The French-American School of New York (FASNY) has its preschool campus in Scarsdale.

The Roman Catholic Archdiocese of New York operates Catholic schools in Westchester County.

Media
The Scarsdale Inquirer, a weekly newspaper, reports on local issues. The newspaper began publishing in 1901.  Scarsdale10583.com also provides extensive weekly news coverage. Scarsdale is served by three PEG (Public, Educational, Government) cable television stations: Scarsdale Public Television (SPTV) on channels 42 and 76, Scarsdale Government Television on channels 43 and 75, and Scarsdale Public Schools (SPS) TV on channels 27 and 77.

Infrastructure

Transportation
Metro-North Railroad stops at the Scarsdale station. Scarsdale is served by the Bee-Line Bus System.

Fire department
Full-time fire and rescue protection is provided by both professional and volunteer firefighters of the Scarsdale Fire Department.

There are three fire stations strategically located within the Village. The Fire Department's Headquarters is located at 50 Tompkins Road. Fire Station No. 1 is located on the corner of Popham and Post Roads next to Village Hall. Fire Station No. 3 is located at 56 Crossway.

The Fire Department was founded in 1893, with the first station being located on Sprague Road.

Police
The Scarsdale Police Department was founded in 1909. As of today, the department consists of 45 full-time Police Officers, 9 civilian employees, and 14 School Crossing Guards. The department is divided into three sections: Investigations, Patrol, and Support Services.

Two officers have been killed in the line of duty: Sgt. John J. Harrison in 1923 and Officer Charles Ackerly in 1956.

Notable people

In popular culture

 During S2E19 episode of Young Sheldon, which aired in 2018, Sheldon exposes his opponent in the student body election by telling the audience she is a "Yankee...born in Scarsdale."
 In the 1951 Pulitzer-winning drama Guys and Dolls, Scarsdale is mentioned as Sky Masterson serenades Sister Sarah in "I'll Know". "You have wished yourself a Scarsdale Galahad...the breakfast-eating, Brooks-brothers type".
 Seinfeld: Kramer is accidentally rewarded with a Tony Award for the fictional musical Scarsdale Surprise, supposedly based on the Scarsdale Diet doctor murder.
 Suits: main character Louis Litt grew up in Scarsdale and attended Scarsdale High School.
 Friends: Ross tells Rachel some of his plans for their future, and mentions that he wishes to raise their future children in Scarsdale.
 Jacob M. Appel's story "Scouting for the Reaper" is set in Scarsdale.
 James Fenimore Cooper's 1821 novel The Spy was set in a house in Scarsdale
 The Broom of the System (1987), the first novel by David Foster Wallace, sets much of Rick Vigorous' and Mindy Metalman's backgrounds in Scarsdale.
 In the 1980 song "Hey Nineteen" by Steely Dan, Scarsdale is mentioned in the lyrics ("...moved down to Scarsdale, where the hell am I?")

See also

References

External links

 Official website for the Village of Scarsdale

 
1788 establishments in New York (state)
American upper class
Towns in the New York metropolitan area
Towns in Westchester County, New York
Villages in New York (state)
Villages in Westchester County, New York